Yunnan under Ming rule saw the continuation of the tusi system instituted during the Yuan dynasty, increasing centralization, and Han migration into Yunnan.

Conquest of Yunnan
 
The Ming dynasty conquered the Northern Yuan-held Yunnan in April 1382. 

The ruling Duan family was removed from power. Duan Ming and his two sons were taken to Nanjing, where they were assigned honorary posts without any power.

Mu Ying, one of the generals who participated in the conquest, was stationed in Yunnan, and his family remained in power until the end of the Ming dynasty.

Administrative history

Zongbing
In 1384, the Hongwu Emperor decided to station Mu Ying in Yunnan permanently. The Mu clan held the hereditary military position of zongbing, or commander-in-chief, the highest military position in Yunnan. As a result, the Mu family became incredibly affluent and wealthy, holding sway over the economy and politics of Yunnan into the 1600s. It was not until 1610 that an inspection of the Mu estates was launched, however no further action was ever taken.

Military immigration
After the conquest of Yunnan, 90,000 soldiers were stationed there. These hereditary military soldiers were encouraged to marry before relocating and were provided with civilian transportation aids by the government. Some were even discharged from the military for being bachelors. Under the weisuo guard battalion system, 30 percent of the military apparatus in Yunnan undertook drilling practice while the rest participated in agricultural production. Military households were followed by land hungry farmers, exiled officials, and profit driven merchants.

The total population of Han settlers in Yunnan in the early 16th century has been estimated to be anywhere between one and three million, about a third of the province's total population. By the end of the Ming dynasty the Han had become the dominant majority in Yunnan. This combination of Han and native cultures paved the way for a province wide Yunnanese identity where there had been none before.

In 1413 a portion of Yunnan was separated and turned into Guizhou province.

Native chieftains
Yunnan was separated into three broad administrative areas: the inner land north of the Baoshan-Yuanjiang line, the "barbarian" area south of the line, and the furthest south known as yuyi, "containing barbarians".

The inner land included Chuxiong, Yaoan, Heqing, Xundian, Wuding, Lijiang, Luoxiong, Zhaozhou, Lu'nan, Jianchuan, Mile, Shizong, Anning, Ami, Luliang, Zhanyi, Luoci, and Yuanmou.

The barbarian area included Cheli (Chiang Hung), Babai (Lanna), Luchuan (abolished in Luchuan-Pingmian Campaigns, year 1444), Nandian (Lianghe), Ganya (Yingjiang), Longchuan (Longchuan), Mengmao (Ruili), Lujiang, Gengma, Chashan, Menglian.

The furthest south known as  had a few commanders stationed there but was only nominally under Ming control.

In total, there were 179 military native chieftains (tusi) and 255 civilian native chieftains in Yunnan during the Ming period. They were given artifacts of authority such as imperial certificates, seals, hats, and belts. The Ming controlled the native succession process and created detailed laws and codes to follow. In 1436 native chieftains were ordered to provide genealogical charts with names of sons and nephews. In 1441 they were ordered to provide four copies of the charts and update it every three years. In 1489 the Ming proclaimed that regency would be held by the state if the successor was younger than 15. In 1555 native chieftains were forbidden from cross-border marriages and from communication with "outer barbarians".

The Ming also began removing native chieftainships where possible. In 1443 the Heqing tusi was removed, in 1478 Xundian, in 1481 Guangxi, in 1522 Ningzhou, in 1585 Luoxiong, in 1607 Wuding, and in 1621 Yunlong.

In 1395 the state began constructing schools in Yunnan.

In 1481 it became regulation for native boys to be selected for education at the Guozijian.

References

Bibliography

 .

 (alk. paper) 
 

 

 .
 

 
  (paperback).
 
 

 
 .
 .

 
 
 

 

 
 
 

 

 

 .

 

 
 .
  
 

 

 

Timelines of Chinese dynasties
 
Imperial China
02

01
States and territories established in 1368
States and territories disestablished in 1644
1368 establishments in Asia
14th-century establishments in China
1644 disestablishments in Asia
1640s disestablishments in China
History of Yunnan